Thorndike Pond is a  water body located in Cheshire County in southwestern New Hampshire, United States, in the towns of Jaffrey and Dublin. The pond is located at the base of Mount Monadnock. Water from Thorndike Pond flows north via Stanley Brook, then east via Nubanusit Brook to the Contoocook River, a tributary of the Merrimack River.

Whittemore Island is centrally located on the lake and contains a looping walking trail that is maintained by The Nature Conservancy.

The lake is classified as a warmwater fishery, with observed species including smallmouth and largemouth bass, chain pickerel, horned pout, and bluegill.

See also

Camp Wanocksett
List of lakes in New Hampshire

References

Lakes of Cheshire County, New Hampshire
Jaffrey, New Hampshire
Dublin, New Hampshire